Pectinodontidae is a family of sea snails or true limpets, marine gastropod mollusks in the superfamily Lottioidea, the true limpets.

Taxonomy 
This family was previously ranked as subfamily Pectinodontinae (also with Acmaeinae and Rhodopetalinae) in the family Acmeaidae in the taxonomy of the Gastropoda by Bouchet & Rocroi (2005).

Nakano & Ozawa (2007)   elevated Pectinodontinae to family level Pectinodontidae based on molecular phylogeny research.

A cladogram showing phylogenic relations of Patellogastropoda:

Genera 
Genera in the family Pectinodontidae include:
 Bathyacmaea
 Bathyacmaea secunda Okutani, Fujikura & Sasaki, 1993
Pectinodonta - the earliest known Pectinodonta are from Late Oligocene

References

Further reading 
  Sasaki T., Okutani T. & Fujikura K. 2006. Anatomy of Bathyacmaea secunda Okutani, Fujikura & Sasaki, 1993 (Patellogastropoda: Acmaeidae). Journal of Molluscan Studies 2006 72(3):295-309;